Antonio Griffo Focas Flavio Angelo Ducas Comneno Porfirogenito Gagliardi De Curtis di Bisanzio (15 February 1898 – 15 April 1967), best known by his stage name Totò, or simply as Antonio de Curtis, and nicknamed il Principe della risata ("the Prince of laughter"), was an Italian actor, comedian, screenwriter, dramatist, poet, singer and lyricist. He was commonly referred to as one of the most popular Italian performers of all time. He is best known for his funny and sometimes cynical character as a comedian in theatre and then in many successful films shot from the 1940s to the 1960s, but he also worked with many iconic Italian film directors in dramatic/poetic roles.

Early life
Totò was born Antonio Vincenzo Stefano Clemente on 15 February 1898 in the Rione Sanità, a poor district of Naples, the illegitimate son of Anna Clemente (1881–1947), a Sicilian woman, and the Neapolitan marquis Giuseppe de Curtis (1873–1944). His father did not legally recognize him, and Totò so regretted growing up without a father that in 1933, at age 35, he managed to have the marquis Francesco Maria Gagliardi Focas adopt him in exchange for a life annuity. As a consequence, when Marquis de Curtis recognized him in 1937 Totò had become an heir of two noble families, ultimately claiming an impressive slew of titles.

Totò's mother wanted him to become a priest, but as early as 1913, at the age of 15, he was already acting as a comedian in small theatres, under the pseudonym Clerment. His early repertoire mostly consisted in imitations of Gustavo De Marco's characters. In the minor venues where he performed, Totò had the chance to meet famous artists like Eduardo and Peppino De Filippo. He served in the army during World War I and then went back to acting. He learned the art of the guitti, the Neapolitan scriptless comedians, heirs to the tradition of the Commedia dell'Arte, and began developing the trademarks of his style, including a puppet-like, disjointed gesticulation, emphasized facial expressions, and an extreme, sometimes surrealistic, sense of humor, largely based on emphasizing primitive urges such as hunger and sexual desire.

Career
In 1922, he moved to Rome to perform in bigger theatres. He performed in the genre of avanspettacolo, a vaudevillian mixture of music, ballet and comedy preceding the main act (hence its name, which roughly translates as "before show"). He became adept at these shows (also known as rivista – Revue), and in the 1930s he had his own company, with which he travelled across Italy. In 1937, he appeared in his first movie Fermo con le mani, and later starred in 96 other films.

As the vast majority of his movies were essentially meant to showcase his performances, many have his name "Totò" in the title. Some of his best-known films are Fifa e Arena, Totò al Giro d'Italia, Totò Sceicco, Guardie e ladri, Totò e le donne, Totò Tarzan, Totò terzo uomo, Totò a colori (one of the first Italian color movies, 1952, in Ferraniacolor), I soliti ignoti, Totò, Peppino e la malafemmina, La legge è legge. Pier Paolo Pasolini's The Hawks and the Sparrows and the episode "Che cosa sono le nuvole" from Capriccio all'italiana (the latter released after his death), showed his dramatic skills.

In his vast cinematographic career, Totò had the opportunity to act side by side with virtually all major Italian actors of the time. With some of them he paired in several films, the most renowned and successful teams being established with Aldo Fabrizi and Peppino De Filippo. De Filippo was one of the few actors to have his name appear in movie titles along with that of Totò, for example in Totò, Peppino e la malafemmina and Totò e Peppino divisi a Berlino.

Partly because of the radical, naive immorality of his roles, some of his more spicy gags raised much controversy in a society that was both strictly Catholic and ruled by the conservative Democrazia Cristiana (Christian Democracy) party. For example, Totò's 1964 movie Che fine ha fatto Totò Baby? (a parody of What Ever Happened to Baby Jane?) included a humorous celebration of cannabis in an era when drugs were perceived by the Italian audience as something exotic, depraved and dangerous.

Writing
During the 1950s, he started to compose poetry. The best-known is probably 'A Livella, in which an arrogant rich man and a humble poor man meet after their deaths and discuss their differences. Totò was also a songwriter: Malafemmena (Wayward Woman), dedicated to his wife Diana after they separated, is considered a classic of the Neapolitan popular music.

Personal life

Totò had a reputation as a playboy. One of his lovers, the well known chanteuse and dancer , committed suicide after their relationship ended. This tragedy marked his life. He buried Liliana in his family's chapel, and named his only daughter Liliana (born 10 May 1933 to his wife, Diana Bandini Rogliani, whom he married in 1935).

Another personal tragedy was the premature birth of his son Massenzio in 1954. The child died a few hours later. He was the son of Totò's mistress Franca Faldini. During a tour in 1956, he lost most of his eyesight due to an eye infection that he had ignored to avoid cancelling his show and disappointing his fans. The handicap however almost never affected his schedule and acting abilities.

Totò died at the age of 69 on 15 April 1967 in Rome after a series of heart attacks. Due to overwhelming demand, there were no fewer than three funeral services: the first in Rome, a second in his birth city of Naples—and a few days later, in a third one by the local Camorra boss, an empty casket was carried along the packed streets of the popular Rione Sanità quarter where he was born.

Noble titles
In 1946, when the Consulta Araldica—the body that advised the Kingdom of Italy on matters of nobility—ceased operations, the Tribunal of Naples recognized his numerous titles, so his complete name was changed from Antonio Clemente to Antonio Griffo Focas Flavio Ducas Komnenos Gagliardi de Curtis of Byzantium, His Imperial Highness, Palatine Count, Knight of the Holy Roman Empire, Exarch of Ravenna, Duke of Macedonia and Illyria, Prince of Constantinople, Cilicia, Thessaly, Pontus, Moldavia, Dardania, Peloponnesus, Count of Cyprus and Epirus, Count and Duke of Drivasto and Durazzo. For someone born and raised in one of the poorest Neapolitan neighbourhoods, this must have been quite an achievement, but in claiming the titles (at the time they had become meaningless) the comedian also mocked them for their intrinsic worthlessness. In fact, when he was not using his stage name Totò, he mostly referred to himself simply as Antonio de Curtis.

Filmography

Actor
Totò starred in 97 films:

Hands Off Me! (1937) as Antonio 'Totò' Toretota
Mad Animals (1939) as Totò / Barone Tolomeo dei Tolomei
Saint John, the Beheaded (1940) as Mastro Agostino Miciacio
The Happy Ghost (1941) as Nicolino & Gelsomino & Antonino
Two Hearts Among the Beasts (1943) as Totò
 (1943)
Romulus and the Sabines (1945) as Aristide Tromboni
The Two Orphans (1947) as Gasparre
Toto Tours Italy (1948) as Prof. Toto' Casamandrei
Fear and Sand (1948) as Nicolino Capece
The Firemen of Viggiù (1949) as The Suitor - Disguises Himself as Dummy / Band Leader
Yvonne of the Night (1949) as Nino, il fantasista
Toto Looks for a House (1949) as Beniamino Lomacchio
The Emperor of Capri (1949) as Antonio De Fazio
Totò Le Mokò (1949) as Antonio Lumaconi / Totò le Moko
Side Street Story (1950) as Pasquale Miele
Figaro Here, Figaro There (1950) as Figaro
Toto Looks for a Wife (1950) as Toto
Totò Tarzan (1950) as Antonio Della Buffas
Bluebeard's Six Wives (1950) as Totò Esposito
Toto the Sheik (1950) as Antonio Sapore, il maggiordomo
47 morto che parla (1950) as Il barone Antonio Peletti
Toto the Third Man (1951) as Piero / Paolo / Totò
Seven Hours of Trouble (1951) as Totò De Pasquale
Cops and Robbers (1951) as Ferdinando Esposito
Toto in Color (1952) as Antonio Scannagatti
Toto and the King of Rome (1952) as Ercole Pappalardo
Toto and the Women (1952) as Antonio Scaparro
One of Those (1953) as Rocco
Man, Beast and Virtue (1953) as Prof. Paolino
Neapolitan Turk (1953) as Felice Sciosciammocca
Funniest Show on Earth (1953) as Tottons, il clown / Una signora del pubblico
Of Life and Love (1954) as Rosario Chiarchiaro (segment "La patente")
Where Is Freedom? (1954) as Salvatore Lojacono
A Slice of Life (1954) as Il fotografo
Poverty and Nobility (1954) as Felice Sciosciammocca
The Doctor of the Mad (1954) as Felice Sciosciammocca
The Three Thieves (1954) as Tapioca
Toto Seeks Peace (1954) as Gennaro Piselli
The Gold of Naples (1954) as Don Saverio Petrillo (segment "Il guappo")
Totò and Carolina (1955) as Antonio Caccavallo
Toto in Hell (1955) as Antonio Marchi / March' Antonio
Carousel of Variety (1955) 
Are We Men or Corporals? (1955) as Toto Esposito
Destination Piovarolo (1955) as Antonio La Quaglia
Roman Tales (1955) as Professore Semprini
Il coraggio (1955) as Gennaro Vaccariello
The Band of Honest Men (1956) as Antonio Buonocore
Totò, lascia o raddoppia? (1956) as Duca Gagliardo della Forcoletta
Toto, Peppino, and the Hussy (1956) as Antonio Caponi
Toto, Peppino and the Outlaws (1956) as Antonio
The Lady Doctor (1957) as Michele 'Mike' Spillone
Toto and Marcellino (1958) as Il professore
The Law Is the Law (1958) as Giuseppe La Paglia
Big Deal on Madonna Street (1958) as Dante Cruciani
Toto, Peppino and the Fanatics (1958) as Ragionier Antonio Vignanelli
Toto in Paris (1958) as Marchese Gastone de Chemantel / Chateau-Boiron / il vagabondo Totò
Toto in the Moon (1958) as Pasquale Belafronte
Legs of Gold (1958) as barone Luigi Fontana
Toto in Madrid (1959) as Totò Scorceletti
The Overtaxed (1959) as Torquato Pezzella
The Thieves (1959) as Commissario Di Sapio
You're on Your Own (1959) as Il nonno illuminato
La cambiale (1959) as Cesare Posalaquaglia
Tough Guys (1960) as L'Algerino
Gentlemen Are Born (1960) as Ottone Degli Ulivi, detto Zazà
Toto, Fabrizi and the Young People Today (1960) as Antonio Cocozza
Letto a tre piazze (1960) as Antonio Di Cosimo
The Passionate Thief (1960) as Umberto 'Infortunio' Pennazzuto
Who Hesitates Is Lost (1960) as Antonio Guardalavecchia
Totò ciak (1960) as Toto
Totò, Peppino e... la dolce vita (1961) as Antonio Barbacane
Sua Eccellenza si fermò a mangiare (1961) as The So-Called Dr Biagio Tanzarella
Totòtruffa 62 (1961) as Antonio Peluffo
The Two Marshals (1961) as Antonio Capurro
Toto vs. Maciste (1962) as Totokamen Sabachi
Totò Diabolicus (1962) as Marquis Galeazzo di Torrealta / Gen. Scipione di Torrealta / Prof. Carlo di Torrealta / Baroness Laudomia di Torrealta / Mons. Antonino di Torrealta / Pasquale Bonocore
Lo smemorato di Collegno (1962) as Lo smemorato
Toto and Peppino Divided in Berlin (1962) as Antonio La Puzza / Canarinis
Toto's First Night (1962) as Nini
The Two Colonels (1962) as Colonnello Di Maggio
The Shortest Day (1962) as Frate bersagliere
Toto vs. the Four (1963) as Antonio Saracino
The Monk of Monza (1963) as Pasquale Cicciacalda / Don Manuel
Toto and Cleopatra (1963) as Mark Antony / Totonno
Le motorizzate (1963) as Urbano Cacace (segment "Il Vigile Ignoto")
Sexy Toto (1963) as Nini Cantachiaro
Gli onorevoli (1963) as Antonio La Trippa
The Commandant (1963) as Col. Antonio Cavalli
Toto vs. the Black Pirate (1964) as José
Beautiful Families (1964) as Filiberto Comanducci (segment "Amare è un po' morire")
What Ever Happened to Baby Toto? (1964) as Totò Baby / il Padre
Toto of Arabia (1965) as Totò
Latin Lovers (1965) as Antonio Gargiulo (segment "Amore e morte")
The Mandrake (1965) as Il Frate
Rita the American Girl (1965) as Serafino Benvenuti
The Hawks and the Sparrows (1966) as Innocenti Totò / Brother Ciccillo
Treasure of San Gennaro (1966) as Don Vincenzo
The Witches (1967) as Ciancicato Miao (segment "La terra vista dalla luna")
The Head of the Family (1968) as Man at Funeral (uncredited, released posthumously)
Caprice Italian Style (1968) as Anziano signore (segment "Mostro della domenica, Il") / Iago (segment "Che cosa sono le nuvole?") (final film role, released posthumously)

Screenwriter
 Il medico dei pazzi
 Totò all'inferno
 Siamo uomini o caporali
 Il coraggio
 I due marescialli

TV
TuttoTotò (1967, aired posthumously)

See also
 Malafemmena, a 1951 song written by Totò

Notes

References

Bibliography
 Giancarlo Governi. Il pianeta Totò. Gremese, 1992. .
 Liliana De Curtis, Matilde Amorosi. Totò a prescindere. Mondadori, 1992. .
 Ennio Bìspuri. Totò: principe clown. Guida Editori, 1997. .
 Alberto Anile. Il cinema di Totò: (1930-1945) : l'estro funambolo e l'ameno spettro. Le mani, 1997. .
 Associazione Antonio De Curtis. Totò, partenopeo e parte napoletano: il teatro, la poesia, la musica. Marsilio, 1998. .
 Alberto Anile. I film di Totò (1946-1967): la maschera tradita. Le mani, 1998.
 Costanzo Ioni, Ruggero Guarini. Tutto Totò. Gremese Editore, 1999. .
 Ennio Bìspuri. Vita di Totò. Gremese Editore, 2000. .
 Franca Faldini, Goffredo Fofi. Totò: l'uomo e la maschera. L'Ancora del Mediterraneo, 2000. .
 Paolo Pistolese. Totò, stars and stripes. Cinecittà, 2000.
 Orio Caldiron. Totò. Gremese Editore, 2001. .
 Antonio Napolitano. Totò, uno e centomila. Tempo Lungo Ed., 2001. .
 Fabio Rossi. La lingua in gioco: da Totò a lezione di retorica. Bulzoni, 2002. .
 Orio Caldiron. Il principe Totò. Gremese Editore, 2002. .
 Liliana De Curtis. Totò, mio padre. Rizzoli, 2002. .
 Daniela Aronica, Gino Frezza, Raffaele Pinto. Totò. Linguaggi e maschere del comico. Carocci, 2003. .
 Patricia Bianchi, Nicola De Blasi. Totò parole di attore e di poeta. Dante & Descartes, 2007. .
 Sonia Pedalino. Totò e la maschera. Firenze Atheneum, 2007. .
 Edmondo Capecelatro, Daniele Gallo. Totò: vita e arte di un genio. Viator, 2008. .
 Liliana De Curtis, Matilde Amorosi. Malafemmena: il romanzo dell'unico, vero, grande amore di Totò. Mondadori, 2009. .
 Ornella Di Russo. Cogito ergo De Curtis. Fermenti, 2013. .

External links

Site of Totò, Antonio De Curtis
Omaggio a Antonio De Curtis in arte Totò
Antonio De Curtis e Totò, vita e opere
Tribute to Totò (in Italian)

Tribute to Totò in "La Patria Grande de Caracas" (in Spanish and Italian)

1898 births
1967 deaths
20th-century Italian comedians
20th-century Italian composers
20th-century Italian dramatists and playwrights
20th-century Italian male actors
20th-century Italian male singers
20th-century Italian male writers
20th-century Italian poets
20th-century Italian screenwriters
Italian lyricists
Italian male comedians
Italian male composers
Italian male dramatists and playwrights
Italian male film actors
Italian male poets
Italian male screenwriters
Italian male stage actors
Italian male television actors
Italian military personnel of World War I
Male actors from Naples
Musicians from Naples
Nastro d'Argento winners
People of Sicilian descent
Writers from Naples